Robert Juan-Cantavella is a Spanish writer born in Almassora in 1976. Currently he lives in Barcelona. He worked as editor-in-chief at the Spanish cultural magazine Lateral.

Books
Asesino Cósmico (Cosmic Killer), novel, Random House-Mondadori, Barcelona, 2011.
El Dorado, novel, Random House-Mondadori, Barcelona, 2008. El Dorado is a parodical, political, punk adventure novel.
Proust Fiction, short-story collection, Poliedro, Barcelona, 2005. The main story, "Proust Fiction", tells how Quentin Tarantino was plagiarized by Marcel Proust.
Otro, novel, Laia Libros, Barcelona, 2001. Experimental novel.

References

External links
 The Quarterly Conversation on El Dorado
 Punk Journalism: Searching for Authenticity and Identity in Robert Juan-Cantavella's 'El Dorado' by Austin Miller, The University of British Columbia
 Robert Juan-Cantavella's short story "El equívoco rugiente", in Spanish, Pterodáctilo magazine, The University of Texas at Austin

Spanish novelists
Spanish male novelists
Writers from the Valencian Community
Living people
1976 births